Paul Tapsell is a New Zealand academic, of Ngāti Whakaue and Ngāti Raukawa descent and as of 2020 is Professor of Indigenous Studies at Melbourne University.

Academic career

After working and studying  at the University of Auckland and a 1998 PhD titled  'Taonga : a tribal response to museums'  at the University of Oxford Faculty of Anthropology and Geography, Tapsell moved to the University of Otago, rising to full professor.

Selected works 
 Abram, Ruth J., Joanne DiCosimo, Stephen H. Baumann, Michele Gallant, Emlyn H. Koster, Gillian Kydd, Susan Pointe et al. Looking reality in the eye: Museums and social responsibility. University of Calgary Press, 2005.
 Tapsell, Paul, and Christine Woods. "Social entrepreneurship and innovation: Self-organization in an indigenous context." Entrepreneurship and Regional Development 22, no. 6 (2010): 535–556.
 Tapsell, Paul. "The flight of Pareraututu: An investigation of taonga from a tribal perspective." The Journal of the Polynesian Society 106, no. 4 (1997): 323–374.
 Tapsell, Paul, and Christine Woods. "A spiral of innovation framework for social entrepreneurship: Social innovation at the generational divide in an indigenous context." Emergence: Complexity and Organization 10, no. 3 (2008): 25.

References

External links
 
 

Living people
Academic staff of the University of Melbourne
Year of birth missing (living people)
New Zealand Māori academics
Alumni of the University of Oxford
University of Auckland alumni
Academic staff of the University of Auckland
Academic staff of the University of Otago
Ngāti Whakaue people
Ngāti Raukawa people